Steve Knight (12 July 1973 – 13 January 2019) was an English professional pool player. Knight spent four times representing the European team at the Mosconi Cup and was the winner of the 2000 World Pool League.

Career
Knight's first major competition was at the 1997 World Pool Masters, reaching the second round of the competition. The following year he reached the quarter-finals of the event. Knight's best result at a world championship was at the 1999 World Professional Pool Championship, reaching the quarter-finals, before losing to Chao Fong-Pang.

In 2000, Knight reached the last 16 of the 2000 WPA World Nine-ball Championship, before losing to former champion Kunihiko Takahashi 9–0. He would compete once again in the World Pool Masters, this time reaching the semi-final.

Knight has also competed at the Mosconi Cup on four occasions. He played for the team between 1998 and 2001.

Achievements
 2000 World Pool League

References

External links

English pool players
Living people
English sportspeople
1973 births